The Albanian Road Authority  or (ARrSh), is an independent, public institution in Albania, whose purpose is to construct and maintain roads and infrastructure in rural areas and between urban areas. It belongs to the Ministry of Infrastructure and Energy and is the legal owner of the roads and has the authority to execute construction of infrastructures on demand from the ministry.

See also
 Transport in Albania
 Highways in Albania

References

Authority
 
Road authorities
Transport organizations based in Albania